Bug juice may refer to:

 Bug Juice, a Disney Channel reality series (1998–2001)
 Bug Juice: My Adventures at Camp, a revival of the Disney Channel series (2018)
 A brand of American fruit-flavored water drink similar to Tum-E Yummies.
 The slang term for super-sweet juice drinks made with artificially flavored powder such as Kool-Aid that are often served at summer camps 
 United States Marine Corps slang for insect repellent
 Slang for moonshine or other forms of alcohol